Soul Food is the Oblivians' first album. It was recorded at Easley Studios in Memphis, Tennessee and released on May 23, 1995, by Crypt Records.

Track listing
"Viet Nam War Blues" (Hopkins) - 2:37
"And Then I Fucked Her" (Oblivians) - 1:20
"Big Black Hole" (Oblivians) - 2:53
"Jim Cole" (Oblivians) - 1:01
"Mad Lover" (Oblivians) - 1:50
"Sunday You Need Love" (Remmler/Gralle) - 2:53
"Never Change" (Oblivians) - 2:37
"No Reason to Live" (Oblivians) - 1:23
"I'm Not a Sicko, There's a Plate in My Head" (Oblivians) - 2:06
"Blew My Cool" (Oblivians) - 1:55
"Cannonball" (Oblivians) - 1:49
"Nigger Rich" (Oblivian/Peebles) - 1:21
"Bum a Ride" (Oblivians) - 2:32
"Any Way You Want It" (Clark) - 1:36
"Static Party" (Oblivians) - 1:39
"Ja Ja Ja" (Remmler/Gralle) - 2:50

Personnel 
 Eric Oblivian - Guitar, drums, vocals
 Greg Oblivian - Guitar, drums, vocals
 Jack Oblivian - Guitar, drums, vocals

References

1995 debut albums
Oblivians albums
Crypt Records albums